Rick King is an American director and screenwriter notable for co-writing the story to the 1991 film Point Break and its 2015 remake.

Filmography as director
 Off the Wall (1977)
 Hard Choices (1985)
 Hotshot (1986)
 The Killing Time (1987)
 Forced March (1989)
 Prayer of the Rollerboys (1990)
 Kickboxer 3: The Art of War (1992)
 Quick (1993)
 A Passion to Kill (1994)
 Terminal Justice (1996)
 Catherine's Grove (1997)
 Road Ends (1997)
 Voices in Wartime (2005)
 Sherman's March (2007)
 Maya Underworld: The Real Doomsday (2012)

References

External links
 

American directors
American screenwriters
Year of birth missing (living people)
Living people